was a town located in Onsen District, Ehime Prefecture, Japan.

As of 2003, the town had an estimated population of 23,729 and a density of 235.90 persons per km². The total area was 100.59 km².

On September 21, 2004, Shigenobu, along with the town of Kawauchi (also from Onsen District), was merged to create the city of Tōon and no longer exists as an independent municipality.

External links
official website 

Dissolved municipalities of Ehime Prefecture
Tōon, Ehime